New Post, Ontario, also known as Long Portage, was a settlement established in the 19th century as a post between the Ojibways and Crees. There were always approximately 50 people living there.

The James Bay Treaty 1905 (Treaty 9) was signed at New Post and the first Chief of the New Post band (Taykwa Tagamou Nation) was Esau Omageese.

Hudson's Bay Company trading posts